Baidar ech Chamout, Baïdar ech Chamoût or Beidar Chamout is a small village located  northeast of Machgara in the Western Beqaa District of Beqaa Governorate in Lebanon.

A Heavy Neolithic archaeological site of the Qaraoun culture is located in the area on the right bank of the Litani river, where the North Cheeta exits from a ravine opposite the Dahr er Rimoul foothills. It was described in detail in Fleisch's report of 1954 and again in 1960. Jacques Cauvin also examined and published details of the materials found, then stored with the Saint Joseph University (now the Museum of Lebanese Prehistory). The Heavy Neolithic pieces were considered identical to those found at Qaraoun II.

A later Neolithic assemblage was found thought to be similar to the Neolithic récent of Byblos consisting of adzes, rabots, chisels and cores. Another assemblage without any triangular points was tentatively suggested to date to the middle Paleolithic, although may actually be Neolithic. The area was under cultivation in 1966.

References

External links
Satelliteviews.net - Baidar ech Chamout
Geographic.com - Baidar ech Chamout
Weather forecast for Baidar ech Chamout

Populated places in Western Beqaa District
Archaeological sites in Lebanon
Heavy Neolithic sites
Neolithic settlements